The Vásquez Cobo–Martins treaty, also known as Treaty of Bogotá, was a treaty between Brazil and Colombia denoting the Brazil–Colombia border; It was signed in Bogotá by their respective representatives, the Minister of Foreign Affairs of Colombia, Alfredo Vásquez Cobo, and the Resident Minister on Special Mission to Colombia, Enéas Martins. It was ratified by Colombia by means of Law 97 of 1907 and the Exchange of Ratifications took place on 20 April 1908 in Rio de Janeiro. The treaty established the border from the Rio Negro northwestward along the Amazon River-Orinoco watershed divide, "then generally southward along various river courses and straight-line segments to the mouth of the Apaporis River"

See also
 García Ortiz-Mangabeira treaty

References

External links
 Vásquez Cobo-Martins treaty (Portuguese)
 Vásquez Cobo-Martins treaty (Spanish)

Treaties concluded in 1907
Treaties of the First Brazilian Republic
Treaties of Colombia
Boundary treaties
1907 in Colombia
1907 in Brazil
Treaties entered into force in 1908
Brazil–Colombia border